Eldar Felekhdinovich Nizamutdinov (born 31 May 1981) is a Russian football striker with Tatar roots. He plays for FC Shinnik Yaroslavl.

Club career
He made his Russian Premier League debut for FC Rotor Volgograd on 6 April 2003 in a game against FC Alania Vladikavkaz.

In 2009, he was loaned to FC Spartak Moscow in the Russian Premier League.

Honours
 Russian Second Division Zone Ural/Povolzhye top scorer: 2006 (14 goals).

References

1981 births
People from Kostroma
Sportspeople from Kostroma Oblast
Tatar people of Russia
Living people
Tatar sportspeople
Russian footballers
Association football midfielders
FC Spartak Kostroma players
FC Rotor Volgograd players
FC Ural Yekaterinburg players
FC Arsenal Tula players
FC Baltika Kaliningrad players
FC Nosta Novotroitsk players
FC Khimki players
FC Spartak Moscow players
FC Spartak Vladikavkaz players
FC Shinnik Yaroslavl players
FC Yenisey Krasnoyarsk players
Russian Premier League players
Russian First League players
Russian Second League players